The 21 municipalities of the Lapland Region in Finland are divided on six sub-regions:

Eastern Lapland sub-region 
Kemijärvi
Pelkosenniemi
Posio
Salla
Savukoski

Kemi-Tornio sub-region 
Kemi
Keminmaa
Simo
Tervola
Tornio

Northern Lapland sub-region 
Inari
Sodankylä
Utsjoki

Rovaniemi sub-region 
Ranua
Rovaniemi

Torne Valley sub-region 
Pello
Ylitornio

Fell Lapland sub-region 
Enontekiö
Kittilä
Kolari
Muonio

Former municipalities 
 Rovaniemen maalaiskunta, merged with Rovaniemi in 2006.
 Kemijärven maalaiskunta, merged with Kemijärvi in 1973.
 Petsamo, ceded to the Soviet Union in 1944.

External links